A Lonely Woman (also known as A Woman Alone) is a 1981 Polish drama film directed by Agnieszka Holland.

The film is a political drama about middle-aged Irena (played by Maria Chwalibóg) who lives alone on the outskirts of Wrocław. Because of the film's social criticism it was banned in Poland and did not have a public release for six years.

Sources

External links

1981 films
Films directed by Agnieszka Holland
Polish drama films
1980s Polish-language films
1981 drama films